Tenology is the first greatest hits album from Australian vocal group The Ten Tenors. Tracks 1,3,4,5,6,8,9,10,14 from album “Larger Than Life”, 2004. Track 2 from album “One Is Not Enough” European Edition, 2002. Track 7 from album “Colours”, 1999. Track 11 from album “A Not So Silent Night”, 2001. Tracks 12, 13 from album “Larger Than Life” Bonus Live CD, 2004.

Track listing

Charts

Weekly charts

Year-end charts

Certifications

Release history

References

2005 greatest hits albums
The Ten Tenors albums
Compilation albums by Australian artists